Nymphaea pubescens, the hairy water lily or pink water-lily, is a species of water lily.

Distribution

This plant is common in shallow lakes and ponds throughout temperate and tropical Asia:
Bangladesh, India, Sri Lanka, Yunnan, Taiwan, Philippines, Cambodia, Laos, Myanmar, Thailand, Vietnam,
Indonesia and Malaysia. It is the national flower of Bangladesh.

It is also found in northeastern Australia and Papua New Guinea.

The hairy water lily is found both as a cultivated plant as well as in the wild. It prefers non-acidic waters and it does not tolerate temperatures below 15 °C.

Description

The hairy water lily is an aquatic plant having erect perennial rhizomes or rootstocks that anchor it to the mud in the bottom.
The rhizomes produce slender stolons.

Its leave blades are round above the water and heart-shaped below 15–26(–50) cm, papery, abaxially densely pubescent.
Some of the leaves that emerge rise slightly above the water held by their stem in lotus fashion, but most of them just float on the surface. The floating leaves have undy edges that make a crenellate effect.

The hairy water lily is also commercialized as an aquarium plant. The underwater leaves of this species have a handsome appearance that is appreciated by aquarists who often remove the floating leaves to keep it as a fully subaquatic plant.

The flowers are quite large, about 15 cm in diameter when fully open. They tend to close during the daytime and open wide at night. Their color varies from white to pink, mauve or purple depending from the variety or hybrid.

Naming and variants

The hairy water lily is known kokaa in Hindi and Kumuda in Sanskrit. The leaves of this plant have fuzzy or hairy undersides and the stems are covered by the same hairs as well, hence the name "pubescens" or "hairy" of the species. This is not a characteristic that is apparent when looking at the plant from above the water though.

This species of water lily has quite a few artificially raised varieties, in addition to many natural hybrids.

Nymphaea pubescens is known under a number of different synonyms, the most common of which is Nymphaea rubra for the reddish variant known under the commercial name Red water lily, which often has also purplish leaves.

References

External links

 
 Studies on Nymphaea species in Bangladesh
 Sorting Nymphaea names
 Nymphaea pubescens - Pictures
 Flora of China 6: 116–118. 2001 - Nymphaea 睡莲属

pubescens
Flora of China
Flora of tropical Asia
Flora of Australia